Fairfield railway station is located on the Hurstbridge line in Victoria, Australia. It serves the north-eastern Melbourne suburb of Fairfield, and opened on 8 May 1888 as Fairfield Park. It was renamed Fairfield on 14 November 1943.

History

Opening on 8 May 1888, when a railway line between Collingwood and Heidelberg was provided, Fairfield station, like the suburb itself, was named after "Fairfield Park", an estate that was subdivided on land that was purchased by land speculator Charles Henry James. The estate is believed to have been named after Fairfield in Derbyshire, England.

From 1891 to 1893, Fairfield was the junction for the northern end of the former Outer Circle line, and was later the junction for the APM Siding, which operated from 1919 to the 1990s, and served the nearby Australian Paper Manufacturers paper mill.

In 1969, boom barriers replaced interlocked gates at the Station Street level crossing, located at the Down end of the station. In 1988, a goods siding at the station was abolished.

In 1999, the station building on Platform 1 underwent restoration works.

Fairfield Industrial Dog Object (FIDO), a 6-metre-tall wooden sculpture of a dog, is located adjacent to the level crossing, at the eastern end of Platform 2.

Platforms and services

Fairfield has two side platforms, and is served by Hurstbridge line trains.

Platform 1:
  stops all stations and express services to Clifton Hill, then stops all stations to Flinders Street

Platform 2:
  all stations and limited express services to Macleod, Greensborough, Eltham and Hurstbridge

Transport links

Dysons operates two routes via Fairfield station, under contract to Public Transport Victoria:
 : Northcote – Regent station
 : Hawthorn Station – Fairfield

Gallery

References

External links
 
 Melway map at street-directory.com.au

Railway stations in Melbourne
Railway stations in Australia opened in 1888
Railway stations in the City of Darebin